The Ripia River is a river of the Hawke's Bay region of New Zealand's North Island. A major tributary of the Mohaka River, it flows generally southeast from its sources at the northern end of the Ahimanawa Range 25 kilometres east of Lake Taupo, reaching the Mohaka 40 kilometres northwest of Napier.

See also
List of rivers of New Zealand

References

Rivers of the Hawke's Bay Region
Rivers of New Zealand